Cierplewo  is a village in the administrative district of Gmina Lubiewo, within Tuchola County, Kuyavian-Pomeranian Voivodeship, in north-central Poland.

The village has a population of 100.

References

Cierplewo